Elgin is a Canadian rural community in Albert County, New Brunswick.

It is situated in the western part of the county, approximately 14 kilometres south of Petitcodiac around the intersection of Route 905, and Route 895

Elgin's economy is centred on agriculture and forestry, including dairy and beef production, as well as maple sugar and wild blueberry production.

History

The first European to settle in the Elgin area was John Geldart, Junior in c. 1806, the eldest son of John Geldart, the Yorkshire settler. Upon his arrival at the Pollett River, the land had extremely dense forest. He and other settlers constructed the first roads, although First Nations' paths existed.
The community was named after James Bruce, 8th Earl of Elgin who was the Governor of the United Province of Canada.

In 1874 the Elgin, Petitcodiac and Havelock Railway was incorporated and a branch line was constructed south from the Intercolonial Railway mainline at Petitcodiac to Elgin, along with a branch line north from Petitcodiac to Havelock.  The railway was reincorporated as the Elgin and Havelock Railway in 1894.  Construction to Elgin was assisted by the community, which borrowed $13,000 (1874 value) from the county as an incentive.

Among other settlers, in the first half of the nineteenth century, the town attracted fugitive African-American slaves who had escaped from the United States. The Crown had resettled Black Loyalists in Nova Scotia after the American Revolutionary War.

Demographics

These general statistics are the newest ones available from 1996
	             Elgin  ~  New Brunswick
Population in 1996   1,027  ~  738,133

Population Break-Down for the Parish of Elgin
                     Total ~ Male ~ Female
Total - All persons  1,030 ~ 530  ~ 500

Language(s) first learned and still understood
                     Total ~ Male ~ Female
Total - All persons  1,025 ~ 530  ~ 500
   English  	     975   ~ 500  ~ 475
   French  	     20    ~ 10   ~ 5
   Both Bilingual    5     ~ 0    ~ 0
   Other languages   (5)   ~ 25   ~ 10

Geography
Land area (km2)      433.44

Industry
1. All Persons in local industries
2. Persons in agriculture and other resource-based industries (primary)
3. Persons in manufacturing and construction industries (secondary)
4. Persons in service industries (tertiary
                    Total ~ Male ~ Female 
Total - All persons  445  ~ 300  ~ 150
                     85   ~ 60   ~ 25
                     95   ~ 85   ~ 10
                     265  ~ 150  ~ 115

Notable people

See also
List of communities in New Brunswick

References

Neighbouring communities
Gowland Mountain
Pollett River
Midland
Churchs Corner
Meadow

Communities in Albert County, New Brunswick
Designated places in New Brunswick
Local service districts of Albert County, New Brunswick